In Greek mythology, Euseirus or Eusiros was the son of Poseidon and father of Cerambus by the nymph Eidothea of Mt. Othrys. His son was changed into a gnawing beetle by the nymphs because of his arrogance. In some myths, Cerambus was borne up into the air on wings by the nymphs escaping the flood of Deucalion.

Note

References 

 Antoninus Liberalis, The Metamorphoses of Antoninus Liberalis translated by Francis Celoria (Routledge 1992). Online version at the Topos Text Project.
Publius Ovidius Nasao, Metamorphoses translated by Brookes More (1859-1942). Boston, Cornhill Publishing Co. 1922. Online version at the Perseus Digital Library.
Publius Ovidius Naso, Metamorphoses. Hugo Magnus. Gotha (Germany). Friedr. Andr. Perthes. 1892. Latin text available at the Perseus Digital Library.

Children of Poseidon